The Castellani Painter was an Attic vase painter of the black-figure style active in the second quarter of the sixth century BC.

The Castellani Painter is especially well known for his drawings on Tyrrhenian amphorae, of which he is considered the most significant painter. His work is distinguished by the use of a vegetal frieze above to animal friezes, as well as by his humorous depictions of large-headed humans and mythical creatures. His conventional name is derived from his name vase, once held in the Castellani Collection.

See also
 List of Greek vase painters

Bibliography 
 John Beazley: Attic Black-Figure Vase-Painters, Oxford 1956, p. 94-106.
 John Boardman: Schwarzfigurige Vasen aus Athen. Ein Handbuch, Mainz 1977, p. 41.
 Jeroen Kluiver: The Tyrrhenian Group of Black-figure Vases. From the Athenian Kerameikos to the Tombs of South Etruria, Amsterdam 2003

External links 

Vases by the Castellani Painter in Perseus

Anonymous artists of antiquity
Ancient Greek vase painters
6th-century BC painters